Chandra K. Clarke is a Canadian author, columnist, and business woman.

Career
Clarke began her career as a freelance journalist, working for several small weeklies and community newspapers in Southwestern Ontario, specializing in municipal affairs and agribusiness reporting, while completing a Bachelor of Arts at Athabasca University. She then took a position as a managing editor before striking out on her own in 1997 to found Scribendi.com, an editorial services company located in Chatham-Kent, Ontario that employs 200 people, and can proofread over 1.5 million words per week.

An advocate of space exploration, Clarke has been involved in several Canadian space advocacy groups, including the Canadian Space Society, the Royal Astronomical Society of Canada and Mars Society Canada. She received her MSc in space studies in 2003 from the University of North Dakota. She is featured in the book   Women of Space: Cool Careers on the Final Frontier. Her website to promote citizen science projects was a 2013 Webby Honoree.

She is also known for her popular weekly humour column, published online and in print in several publications around the world. Formerly known as In My Humble Opinion, it is now simply published under her name. The column is an eclectic, humorous look at such universal issues as family, parenthood, and modern life, as well as the latest science and technology news.

Clarke also presents at conferences and panels on technology issues and women in business.

Awards and honors
As an entrepreneur, Clarke has achieved prominence both at home and abroad. In 2009, she led the company to win Best in Class at the Interactive Media Awards, and was a finalist for Best Canadian Entrepreneur, Best Overall Company of the Year, and Most Innovative Company of the Year at the Stevie Awards for Women in Business, at ceremonies held in New York. In 2010, her company won an International Business Award for Best Writing/Web Content, beating a much larger rival, Accenture, at ceremonies held in Istanbul. In 2010 she was an Enterprising Woman of the Year finalist in Enterprising Women magazine, as well as named "one of the top 25 most amazing women of the year" by Stiletto Woman Magazine. In 2011 she was awarded the Woman Exporter Year award by the Organization of Women in International Trade Toronto chapter.

In addition, she has been listed for three consecutive years on Profit W100, an annual ranking of Canada's top women entrepreneurs.

References

External links
Official website
Scribendi Inc.

1972 births
Living people
Canadian bloggers
Canadian columnists
University of North Dakota alumni
Canadian women journalists
Canadian women columnists
Canadian women bloggers